Simhasanam may refer to:
 Simhasanam (1986 film), an Indian Telugu-language epic historical film
 Simhasanam (2012 film), a Malayalam action film